MUKS Praga Warszawa, in English known as Praga Warsaw, is a women's football club from Warsaw, Poland. It was founded in 2001. After starting in the 2nd tier of Poland, the team managed promotion to the then highest league, the I Liga in 2003–04. In the following season though with the creation of the Ekstraliga Kobiet as new top league the team couldn't qualify. After three seasons in the level two leagues, the team got promotion in 2007–08 and played two seasons in the Ekstraliga before getting relegated in 2009–10.

Women's statistics

References

External links 
 Club's profile at 90minut.pl

Women's football clubs in Poland
Football clubs in Warsaw
Association football clubs established in 2001
2001 establishments in Poland